José Manuel Durão Barroso (born 23 March 1956) is a Portuguese politician and university teacher, currently serving as non-executive chairman of Goldman Sachs International. He previously served as the 11th president of the European Commission and the 115th prime minister of Portugal.

Academic career
Durão Barroso (as he is known in Portugal) graduated in law from the Faculty of Law of the University of Lisbon. He subsequently obtained a Diploma in European Studies from the European University Institute, and received a MA degree with honours in both Political Science and Social Sciences from the University of Geneva in Switzerland. His academic career continued as an assistant professor in the Faculty of Law of the University of Lisbon. Barroso did PhD research at Georgetown University and Georgetown's Edmund A. Walsh School of Foreign Service in Washington, D.C., but his CV does not list any doctoral degree (except honorary). He is a 1998 graduate of the Georgetown Leadership Seminar. Back in Lisbon, Barroso became director of the Department for International Relations at Lusíada University (Universidade Lusíada).

Barroso is now a policy fellow at the Liechtenstein Institute on Self-Determination at Princeton University and the Frederick H. Schultz Class of 1951 Visiting Professor of International Economic Policy at Princeton's Woodrow Wilson School of Public and International Affairs Woodrow Wilson School, where he teaches with Wolfgang F. Danspeckgruber on the EU in International Affairs. Barroso also teaches at the Graduate Institute of International and Development Studies and at the University of Geneva.
At Católica Global School of Law, he has taught the seminar on "The Dynamics of European Union Institutions" since 2015, on two LL.M. programmes.

Early political career

Barroso's political activity began in his late teens, during the Estado Novo regime in Portugal, before the Carnation Revolution of 25 April 1974. In his university days, he was one of the leaders of the underground Maoist MRPP (Re-Organized Movement of the Proletariat Party, later Portuguese Workers' Communist Party (PCTP/MRPP), Communist Party of the Portuguese Workers/Revolutionary Movement of the Portuguese Proletariat). In an interview with the newspaper Expresso, he said that he had joined MRPP to fight the only other student body movement, also underground, which was controlled by the Portuguese Communist Party. Despite this justification, there is a very famous political 1976 interview recorded by the Portuguese state-run television channel, RTP, in which Barroso, as a politically minded student during the post-Carnation Revolution turmoil known as PREC, criticises the bourgeois education system which "throws students against workers and workers against students." In December 1980, Barroso joined the right-of-centre PPD (Democratic Popular Party, later PPD/PSD-Social Democratic Party), where he remains to the present day.

In 1985, under the PSD government of Aníbal Cavaco Silva, 113th prime minister of Portugal, Barroso was named Under-Secretary of State in the Ministry of Home Affairs. In 1987 he became a member of the same government as he was elevated to Secretary of State for Foreign Affairs and Cooperation (answering to the Minister of Foreign Affairs), a post he was to hold for the next five years. In this capacity, he was the driving force behind the Bicesse Accords of 1990, which led to a temporary armistice in the Angolan Civil War between the ruling MPLA and the opposition UNITA. He also supported independence for East Timor, a former Portuguese colony, then a province of Indonesia by force. In 1992, Barroso was promoted to the post of Minister of Foreign Affairs, and served in this capacity until the defeat of the PSD in the 1995 general election.

Prime minister of Portugal
While in opposition, Barroso was elected to the Assembly of the Republic in 1995 as a representative for Lisbon. There, he became chairman of the Foreign Affairs Committee. In 1999 he was elected president of his political party, PSD, succeeding Marcelo Rebelo de Sousa (a professor of law), and thus became Leader of the Opposition. Parliamentary elections in 2002 gave the PSD enough seats to form a coalition government with the right-wing Portuguese People's Party, and Barroso subsequently became Prime Minister of Portugal on 6 April 2002.

As prime minister, facing a growing budget deficit, he made a number of difficult decisions and adopted strict reforms. He vowed to reduce public expenditure, which made him unpopular among leftists and public servants.. His purpose was to lower the public budget deficit to a 3% target (according to the demands of EU rules), and official data during the 2002–2004 period stated that the target was being attained.

In March 2003, Barroso hosted U.S President George W. Bush, British Prime Minister Tony Blair and Spanish Prime Minister José María Aznar in the Portuguese island of Terceira, in the Azores. The four leaders finalised the controversial US-led 2003 invasion of Iraq. Under Barroso's leadership, Portugal became part of the "coalition of the willing" for the invasion and occupation of Iraq, sending non-combat troops. On 30 January 2003, Barroso signed The letter of the eight supporting US. policy on Iraq.
 
Barroso did not finish his term as he had been nominated as president of the European Commission on 5 July 2004. Barroso arranged with Portuguese President Jorge Sampaio to nominate Pedro Santana Lopes as a substitute prime minister of Portugal. Santana Lopes led the PSD/PP coalition for a few months until early 2005, when new elections were called. When the Portuguese Socialist Party won the elections it produced an estimation that by the end of the year the budget deficit would reach 6.1%, which it used to criticise Barroso's and Santana Lopes's economic policies.

President of the European Commission

In 2004, the proposed European Constitution and now the Treaty of Lisbon included a provision that the choice of president must take into account the result of Parliamentary elections and the candidate supported by the victorious Europarty in particular. That provision was not in force in the nomination in 2004, but the centre-right European People's Party (EPP), who won the elections, pressured for a candidate from its own ranks. In the end, José Manuel Barroso, the EPP candidate, was chosen by the European Council.

On the same basis, the EPP again endorsed Barroso for a second term during the 2009 European election campaign and, after the EPP again won the elections, was able to secure his nomination by the European Council on 17 June 2009. On 3 September 2009, Barroso unveiled his manifesto for his second term. On 16 September 2009, Barroso was re-elected by the European Parliament for another five years. Since he completed his second term he became only the second Commission president to serve two terms, after Jacques Delors. That Commission's term of office ran until 31 October 2014.

During his first presidency, the following important issues were on the Commission's agenda:
 Turkey applying for EU membership
 The reform of the institutions (Treaty of Lisbon)
 The Bolkestein directive, aimed at creating a single market for services within the EU
 Lisbon Strategy
 Galileo positioning system
 Doha Development Agenda negotiations
 European Institute of Innovation and Technology
 An EU climate change package

One of his first tasks since being re-elected was a visit to Ireland to persuade Irish citizens to approve the Treaty of Lisbon in the country's second referendum due to be held the following month. Barroso was greeted by Irish Minister for Defence Willie O'Dea and Peter Power, the Minister of State for Overseas Development, as he got off his plane at Shannon Airport on the morning of 19 September 2009 before briefly meeting with the joint committee of the Oireachtas and meeting and greeting people at functions in Limerick's City Hall, University of Limerick (UL) and the Savoy Hotel. He told The Irish Times in an interview referenced internationally by Reuters that he had been asked if Ireland would split from the European Union. He also launched a €14.8 million grant for former workers at Dell's Limerick plant, described as "conveniently opportune" by former Member of the European Parliament and anti-Lisbonite Patricia McKenna.

On 12 September 2012 Barroso has called for the EU to evolve into a "federation of nation-states". Addressing the EU parliament in Strasbourg, Barroso said such a move was necessary to combat the continent's economic crisis. He said he believed Greece would be able to stay in the eurozone if it stood by its commitments. Mr Barroso also set out plans for a single supervisory mechanism for all banks in the eurozone.

He was once appointed Acting Commissioner for Inter-Institutional Relations and Administration in Maroš Šefčovič's stead, from 19 April 2014 – 25 May 2014 while he was on electoral campaign leave for the 2014 elections to the European Parliament. He ultimately decided to not take up his seat.

Controversies
In 2005, Die Welt reported that Barroso had spent a week on the yacht of the Greek shipping billionaire Spiro Latsis. It emerged soon afterwards that this had occurred only a month before the Commission approved 10 million euros of Greek state aid for Latsis's shipping company – though the state aid decision had been taken by the previous European Commission before Barroso took up his post. In response to this revelation, Nigel Farage MEP of the UK Independence Party persuaded around 75 MEPs from across the political spectrum to back a motion of no confidence in Barroso, so as to compel him to appear before the European Parliament to be questioned on the matter. The motion was tabled on 12 May 2005, and Barroso appeared before Parliament as required at a debate on 26 May 2005. The motion itself was heavily defeated.

In response to criticism for his choice of a less fuel efficient Volkswagen Touareg, amid EU legislation of targets drastically to reduce car  emissions, Barroso dismissed this as "overzealous moralism".

In April 2008, amid sharp food price rises and mounting food vs fuel concerns, Barroso insisted that biofuel use was "not significant" in pushing up food prices. The following month, he announced a study that would look into the issue. The backdoor approval of the GE potato, by President Barroso, has met a wave of strong opposition from EU member-states. The governments of Greece, Austria, Luxembourg, Italy, Hungary and France have all publicly announced that they will not allow the GE potato to be grown in their countries.

Barroso has expressed criticism of national governments arguing "Decisions taken by the most democratic institutions in the world are very often wrong."

In December 2013 Barroso said that Europe was not the cause of the problems for Ireland; Ireland caused a problem for Europe. Following the bailout exit, in December 2013, the Irish government's bid to get backdated funding for the banking sector was rejected as the head of the European Commission blamed the Irish banks, regulators and government for the difficulties in the country. Barroso said the problems in the Irish banks caused a "major destabilisation" in the euro, rather than structural problems with the currency itself, "I am saying this because it would be wrong to give the impression that Europe has created a problem for Ireland and now Europe has to help Ireland. In fact, it was the banking sector in Ireland—it was one of the biggest problems in the world in terms of banking stability what happened in Ireland."

Barroso was heavily criticised for taking a position as a chairman and senior adviser to the international arm of Goldman Sachs. He did so two months after the 18-month "cooling-off" period for EU officials after they leave their posts. Barroso's move was especially sensitive because Goldman Sachs is an American institution that played a questionable role in the financial crisis that nearly broke the euro. Furthermore, Barroso announced his move to the London-based subsidiary of Goldman Sachs shortly after the Brexit referendum. The European Commission agreed to an unprecedented ethics inquiry into the move. The independent panel concluded there were "not sufficient grounds to establish a violation of the duty of integrity and discretion" and accepted Barroso's assurances that he would not be lobbying on behalf of the bank's clients.

Other activities

In July 2016, Barroso became the non-executive chairman of London-based Goldman Sachs International (GSI), the bank's largest subsidiary. He is also an adviser to the bank. At the time of his appointments, this position was regarded as quite controversial, and later led Barroso's successor Jean-Claude Juncker to launch an ethics investigation.

In 2020, Barroso was selected as chair of the board at GAVI, succeeding Ngozi Okonjo-Iweala.

In addition, Barroso has held several paid and unpaid positions, including:
 International Commission on Financing Global Education Opportunity (led by Gordon Brown), Member (since 2015)
 Bilderberg Meetings, Member of the Steering Committee (since 2014)
 Chatham House, Member of the Panel of Senior Advisers
 European Business Summit (EBS), Honorary Chairman of the Honorary Committee (since 2014)
 Europaeum, Member of the Board of Trustees (since 2014)
 European Movement International, Member of the Honorary Council
 Kofi Annan Foundation, Member of the Electoral Integrity Initiative (EII) (since 2016)
 Lindau Nobel Laureate Meetings, Member of the Honorary Senate
 Women Political Leaders Global Forum (WPL), Member of the Global Advisory Board
 Sunhak Peace Prize Selection Committee, chair. 

 UEFA Foundation for Children, Member of the Board of Trustees (2014-2017)

Personal life
Barroso is the son of Luís António Saraiva Barroso and his wife Maria Elisabete de Freitas Durão. In 1980 he married Maria Margarida Pinto Ribeiro de Sousa Uva, with whom he has three sons. Sousa Uva died from uterine cancer in August 2016, at the age of 60.

Apart from Portuguese, Barroso is fluent in French, speaks Spanish and English and has taken a course to acquire a basic knowledge of German.

Honours 
Barroso holds over twenty decorations, including.
 Grand Cross of the Order of Christ (Portugal) in 1996;
 Winner of the Casa da Imprensa prize in the area of politics in 1992
 Named Global Leader for Tomorrow by the World Economic Forum in 1993
 Chosen Personality of the Year in 1991 and 2004 by the Foreign Press Association in Portugal
 Given "Medalla de la Universidad de Alcala de Henares" and "Medalla de Oro de la Ciudad de Zamora", Spain, 2005
 Golden Medal: The Bell Celebration – Message to the United Europe, from the Ferdinan Martinengo Company, Slovakia, 2006
 EFR-Business Week Award from Erasmus University Rotterdam, 2006.
 Honorary Citizen of Rio de Janeiro, June 2006.
 "European of the Year" award by European Voice newspaper, November 2006.
 Awarded Honorary HEC diploma, Paris, December 2006.
 Special Prize, Business Centre Club, Poland, February 2007; Gold Medal of the city of Lamego, Portugal, April 2007;
 Transatlantic Leadership Prize, European Institute, Washington DC, April 2007;
 Grand Cross of the Order of Vytautas the Great (Lithuania, 06/2007)
 Honorary Citizen of Delphi and Golden Medal of the "Amfiktyons", Delphi, Greece, July 2007;
 Academic Title EBAPE – FGV, for the relevant contribution and services towards the study and practice in Administration – Getulio Vargas Foundation, Rio de Janeiro, August 2007
 Conde de Barcelona International Prize from the Conde de Barcelona Foundation, Barcelona, November 2007.
 Honorary Medal and Honorary Diploma of the City of Nicosia, Nicosia, January 2008.
 Honorary Member, Academia Portuguesa da História, Lisbon, March 2008.
 State Medal "Stara Planina" I Degree, Bulgaria, March 2008.
 "Prémio Rotary da Paz", Rotary International Distrito 1960 Portugal, Lisbon, April 2008; "Chave de Honra da Cidade de Lisboa", Lisbon, May 2008.
 Confraria Queijo S. Jorge, Acores, May 2008.
 Ciudadino Andino Honorifico, Lima, Peru, May 2008.
 "Transatlantic Business Award", American Chamber of Commerce to the European Union, Brussels, May 2008.
 Confraria vinho do Porto, Porto, June 2008.
 Order of the Cross of Terra Mariana, First Class, Tallinn, February 2009.
 Gold Medal of the Royal Institute of European Studies, Royal Institute of European Studies Madrid, March 2009.
 Gold Medal of the Hellenic Parliament, Athens, April 2009.
 Medal of Honour and Benefaction of the City of Athens, Athens, April 2009.
 European Excellence Award, by the Government Council of the Community of Madrid, May 2009.
 Prix European of the Year, The European Movement in Denmark, Copenhagen, May 2009.
 Grand Cross of the Order of Orange-Nassau.
 Laureate of the Quadriga Prize 2009 – United for the Better, Berlin, October 2009
 Collar of the "Order pro merito Melitensi" [Civilian Class], the Order of Malta, Rome, May 2010.
 Medal of Merit from the Federação das Associações Portuguesas e Luso-brasileiras, Brazil, July 2010.
 "Man of the Year 2009 of Central and Eastern Europe", Krynica, September 2010.
 Great Collar of the Order of Timor-Leste, Brussels, October 2010.
 Golden Victoria "European of the Year 2010" award by the Union of German Magazine Publishers VDZ, Berlin, November 2010.
 Collier of the Fondation du Mérite européen, Luxembourg, November 2010.
 the "Steiger" Award 2011, Bochum, Germany, March 2011.
 Charles V Prize, awarded by the Fundación Academia Europea de Yuste, Spain, 2013
 Gold Medal for Outstanding Contribution to Public Discourse, the College Historical Society (CHS) of Trinity College Dublin.
 Gold Medal of the Jean Monnet Foundation for Europe, in 2014.

Honorary degrees 
 Honorary Degree from Roger Williams University, Rhode Island, 2005
 Honorary Degree in Humanities from Georgetown University, Washington, D.C.
 Honorary Degree in Political Science from the University of Genoa, Italy, 2006
 Honorary Degree in Law from Kobe University, Japan, April 2006.
 Honorary Doctorate in Social and Human Sciences from Candido Mendes University, Rio de Janeiro, June 2006.
 Honorary Degree of Doctor of Science, University of Edinburgh, November 2006.
 Honorary Degree from the Economics Faculty of the "La Sapienza" University of Rome, January 2007
 Honorary doctorate at Warsaw School of Economics, Warsaw, November 2007.
 Doctor Honoris Causa degree at the Pontifical Catholic University of Sao Paulo, Brazil, March 2008.
 Honorary degree of Doctor of Laws, University of Liverpool, July 2008; 
 "Prémio Política e Responsabilidade Social", Fundação Luso-Brasileira, Lisbon, October 2008.
 Honorary Degree of Doctor, Université Nice Sophia Antipolis, Nice, November 2008.
 Doctor Honoris Causa, Tomas Bata University, Zlin, Czech Republic, April 2009.
 Honorary doctorate of the Chemnitz University of Technology, Chemnitz, May 2009.
 Honorary doctorate of Public and International Affairs, University of Pittsburgh, US, September 2009.
 Doctor Honoris Causa, Estácio de Sá University, Rio de Janeiro, July 2010.
 Doctorate Honoris Causa, Łódź University, Poland, October 2010.
 Doctorate Honoris Causa, University of Geneva, October 2010.
 Doctorate Honoris Causa, University of Bucharest, November 2010.
 Honorary Doctorate, Baku State University, Azerbaijan, January 2011.
 Honorary Doctorate, Luiss Guido Carli University, Rome, March 2011.
 Honorary Doctorate, Ghent University, March 2011.
 Honorary Doctorate, National Economic University of Vietnam, August 2014.
 Doctorate Honoris Causa, West University of Timișoara, January 2016.

See also
 President of the European Commission
 European Union law

References

External links

 President José Manuel Barroso – Official Media Gallery
 European Commission 2004–2010 – President (archived site)
 European Commission 2010–2014 – President (archived site)

|-

1956 births
Articles containing video clips
Walsh School of Foreign Service alumni
European People's Party politicians
Foreign ministers of Portugal
Academic staff of the Graduate Institute of International and Development Studies
Goldman Sachs people
Living people
People from Lisbon
Portuguese European Commissioners
Portuguese politicians
Portuguese Roman Catholics
Portuguese expatriates in Switzerland
Portuguese Workers' Communist Party politicians
Presidents of the European Commission
Prime Ministers of Portugal
Social Democratic Party (Portugal) politicians
University of Lisbon alumni
Former Marxists

Grand Crosses 1st class of the Order of Merit of the Federal Republic of Germany
Grand Collars of the Order of Prince Henry
Grand Crosses of the Order of Vytautas the Great
Recipients of the Order of the Cross of Terra Mariana, 1st Class
Recipients of the Order pro Merito Melitensi
European Commissioners 2004–2009
European Commissioners 2009–2014